Valparai taluk is a taluk of Coimbatore district of the Indian state of Tamil Nadu. The headquarters is the town of Valparai. Anaimalai Hills Village is the only revenue villages under this revenue.

Demographics
According to the 2011 census, the taluk of Valparai had a population of 70,771 with 35,270 males and 35,501 females. There were 1,007 women for every 1,000 men. The taluk had a literacy rate of 79.07%. Child population in the age group below 6 years were 2,227 Males and 2,135 Females.

References 

Taluks of Coimbatore district